Denso Hall, officially The Max Denso Hall and Library, is a library located in Karachi, Pakistan. It was built in 1886 as the first library in Karachi to serve the native population.

Location 
Denso Hall and Library is located at a triangular corner formed by Mohammad Ali Jinnah Road, Murad Khan Road, and Marriott Road in the borough of Saddar Town, in central Karachi.

History 
The British colonial government built libraries in Karachi, such as at Frere Hall, but they were restricted to British colonial officers and their families. Denso Hall was constructed in 1886 as the first library for the natives of Karachi. It was named for Max Denso, who chaired the Karachi Chamber of Commerce in the 1870s.

Architecture
James Strachan was the architect of the project and the building was completed in 1886. The architectural design is Venetian gothic, with Tudor elements on the top floor. Local Gizri sandstone was used in the construction. When the building was completed it had one library and one reading-room on the ground floor, and the main hall on the first floor. The main road facing side has balconies with sculpted balusters. The clock on the top was a gift from Rao Sahib Ramdas Morarji, a local Parsi philanthropist who also donated 1,800 books to the library. The local Khoja community donated another 1,200.

Conservation 
In 2010, it was announced that the Heritage Foundation Pakistan, with financial support from Karachi Electric Supply Corporation, would restore Denso Hall as a Heritage site. In 2019, the hall's facade, along with other heritage structures on Marriott Road, were cleaned.

See also 
 Heritage Foundation Pakistan
 Khaliq Deena Hall

References

External links 

 Libraries in Karachi
 Max Denso Hall: Signposts to history
 Heritage Foundation Pakistan

Library buildings completed in 1886
Libraries in Karachi
Buildings and structures in Karachi
Heritage sites in Karachi
1886 establishments in British India